Md. Abdul Odud (born 1 January 1964) is a Bangladesh Awami League politician who is the incumbent Jatiya Sangsad member representing the Chapai Nawabganj-3 constituency.

References

Living people
1964 births
Awami League politicians
9th Jatiya Sangsad members
10th Jatiya Sangsad members
11th Jatiya Sangsad members
Place of birth missing (living people)